Hara hara is a species of South Asian river catfish that occurs in Bangladesh, China, India, Myanmar and Nepal.  This species grows to a length of  TL.

References 
 

Erethistidae
Fish of Bangladesh
Freshwater fish of China
Freshwater fish of India
Fish of Myanmar
Fish of Nepal
Taxa named by Francis Buchanan-Hamilton
Fish described in 1822